Rača was a village in the municipality of Kuršumlija, Serbia. According to the 2002 census, the village had a population of 247 people.

References

Populated places in Toplica District